Fedosei Ciumacenco (born 27 January 1973) is a Moldovan race walker.

He was born in Bendery. He competed in the 20-kilometre walk at the Olympic Games in 1996, 2000, 2004 and 2008, and the World Championships in 1997, 1999 and 2003.

Achievements

References

1973 births
Living people
Moldovan male racewalkers

Athletes (track and field) at the 1996 Summer Olympics
Athletes (track and field) at the 2000 Summer Olympics
Athletes (track and field) at the 2004 Summer Olympics
Athletes (track and field) at the 2008 Summer Olympics
Olympic athletes of Moldova
People from Bender, Moldova
World Athletics Championships athletes for Moldova